The European Film Actor School is an educational establishment located in Zurich, Switzerland.

External links
 

Drama schools
Education in Zürich